Fatemeh Daneshvar (born 7 December 1975) is an Iranian businesswoman, entrepreneur and reformist politician who is currently an outgoing member of City Council of Tehran. She is graduated of Business Management from Tehran University and is also president of the Iran Chamber of Commerce, Industries, Mines & Agriculture. She is CEO of Sayahan Sepehr Asia Company and is one of the richest persons in Iran.

References

Living people
Businesspeople from Tehran
1975 births
21st-century Iranian women politicians
21st-century Iranian politicians
Iranian philanthropists
Iranian reformists
University of Tehran alumni
Tehran Councillors 2013–2017
Iranian women in business